The 1978 Big Eight Conference men's basketball tournament was held February 28–March 4 at a combination of on-campus gymnasiums and Kemper Arena in Kansas City, Missouri.

Seventh-seeded  upset defending champions  in the championship game, 71–68 (in double overtime), to capture their first Big Eight men's basketball tournament.

The Tigers, in turn, received a bid to the 1978 NCAA tournament. They were joined in the tournament by the Big 8's regular season champion, Kansas, who earned at-large bid.

Format
All eight of the conference's members participated in the tournament field. They were seeded based on regular season conference records, with all teams beginning play in the initial quarterfinal round.

All first round games were played on the home court of the higher-seeded team. The semifinals and championship game, in turn, were played at a neutral site at Kemper Arena in Kansas City, Missouri.

Bracket

References

Tournament
Big Eight Conference men's basketball tournament
Big Eight Conference men's basketball tournament
Big Eight Conference men's basketball tournament
Big Eight Conference men's basketball tournament